Uña Paka (Quechua uña little animal, paka eagle, "little eagle", Hispanicized spelling Uñapaca) is a mountain in the Huancavelica Region in Peru, about  high. It is located in the Huancavelica Province, Huachocolpa District, and in the Huaytará Province, Pilpichaca District. It lies north of a little lake named Yanaqucha ("black lake").

References 

Mountains of Peru
Mountains of Huancavelica Region